Paintsville Lake is a  reservoir in Johnson and Morgan counties in eastern Kentucky. It was impounded from Paint Creek in 1983 by the United States Army Corps of Engineers. It is the major attraction of Paintsville Lake State Park.

History

Paintsville Lake officially opened to the public in 1983, three years before Paintsville Lake State Park was established.

On December 9, 1978, ten-thousand Johnson County residences had to be evacuated from the area below the construction site of the Paintsville Lake dam. This is because the area had recently received eight inches (200 mm)  of rain, which had caused a leak in the coffer dam that was keeping the construction site of the actual dam dry. The dam did not break, and the residents were allowed to return to their homes the following day.

Fish species

Paintsville Lake has a variety of game fishing species. Fish that can be caught in the lake include:

Gallery

See also
Paintsville Lake State Park

References

External links
Paintsville Lake facilities map
Paintsville Lake area interactive GIS map

1983 establishments in Kentucky
Reservoirs in Kentucky
Protected areas of Johnson County, Kentucky
Protected areas of Morgan County, Kentucky
Dams in Kentucky
United States Army Corps of Engineers dams
Bodies of water of Johnson County, Kentucky
Bodies of water of Morgan County, Kentucky
Infrastructure completed in 1983